Catrum was an ancient city and diocese in Africa Proconsulare. It is now a Roman Catholic titular see.

History 
Catrum was among the numerous cities in the Roman province of Mauritania Caesariensis which were important enough to become suffragan dioceses, but faded (plausibly at the 7th century advent of Islam) - in its case so completely that even its location in present Algeria is unclear.
 
No bishop was historically documented.

Titular see 
The diocese was nominally restored in 1989 as Latin Titular bishopric of Catrum (Latin) / Catro (Curiate Italian) / Catrensis (Latin adjective).

It has had the following incumbents, so far of the fitting Episcopal (lowest) rank :
 František Rábek (1991.07.13 – 2003.01.20) as Auxiliary Bishop of Diocese of Nitra (Slovakia) (1991.07.13 – 2003.01.20); later Military Ordinary of Slovakia (Slovakia) (2003.01.20 – ...)
 Werner Guballa (2003.02.20 – death 2012.02.27) as Auxiliary Bishop of Diocese of Mainz (Germany) (2003.02.20 – 2012.02.27)
 Nelson Jesus Perez (2012.06.08 – 2017.09.05), Auxiliary Bishop of Diocese of Rockville Centre (USA) (2012.06.08 – 2017.09.05).

See also 
 List of Catholic dioceses in Algeria

Sources and external links 
 GCatholic
 Pius Bonifacius Gams, Series episcoporum Ecclesiae Catholicae, Leipzig 1931, p. 465
 Stefano Antonio Morcelli, Africa christiana, Volume I, Brescia 1816, p. 132

Catholic titular sees in Africa
Suppressed Roman Catholic dioceses